Saurogobio lissilabris is a species of cyprinid fish found in China.

References

Saurogobio
Fish described in 1973
Taxa named by Petre Mihai Bănărescu
Taxa named by Teodor T. Nalbant